Edwin Velasco (born 5 November 1991) is a Colombian professional footballer who plays as a left back for America de Cali.

References

External links 
 

1991 births
Living people
Colombian footballers
Atlético Nacional footballers
Once Caldas footballers
Cortuluá footballers
América de Cali footballers
Categoría Primera A players
Categoría Primera B players
Association football fullbacks
Sportspeople from Cauca Department